Pedro Betancourt, sometimes shortened as Betancourt, is a municipality and town in the Matanzas Province of Cuba. It is located in the center of the province, west of Jagüey Grande and east of Unión de Reyes. It was founded in 1833.

History
Its original name was Corral Falso de Macurijes. Pedro Betancourt's name comes from a famous Spanish-Cuban patriot, Pedro Estanislao Betancourt Dávalos, who was one of the Major-General in the independence war, waged by the Cuban natives against the Spanish Crown.

Geography
The municipality was historically divided into the barrios of Cabecera Norte, Cabecera Sur (both constituting the town), Ciego, Linche, Navajas, Platanal, Punta Brava, Torriente and Tramojos. Nowadays it counts the town itself and 7 popular councils (consejos populares, i.e. villages): The main town of  Betancourt and the villages of Bolondrón, Camilo, Güira de Macurijes, Manolito, Navajas and Pedroso-Socorro.

Demographics
In 2004, the municipality of Pedro Betancourt had a population of 32,218.

Sisters towns
  Nuevo San Juan Parangaricutiro, Mexico

See also
Municipalities of Cuba
List of cities in Cuba

References

External links

Populated places in Matanzas Province